On April  24, 2022, Iliana "Lily" Peters, a 10-year old American girl, was killed and raped in Chippewa Falls, Wisconsin. The killing gained significant attention and media coverage due to the ages of both the victim and the suspect.

On April 26, 2022, Peters' cousin, 14-year old Carson Peters-Berger was arrested on charges of murder and rape. Carson was originally publicly identified only by his initials "CPB". He is being tried as an adult due to the murder charge.

Killing
According to the criminal complaint, 14-year-old Carson Peters-Berger asked his cousin, 10-year old Lily Peters to take a walk and explore a trail. Lily took her bike and Carson took his hoverboard. Once they were off the trail, it is alleged that Carson punched Lily in the stomach and pushed her to the ground, then hit her in the head three times with a large stick and strangled her until she was dead. Carson then allegedly raped Lily's dead body.

The criminal complaint alleged that Carson then became scared and fled, went home where he showered and cleaned his clothes, then went back to the scene and dragged Lily's body a few feet and covered her body with leaves.

Investigation
Lily Peters was reported missing by her father and her body was discovered the following day at 8:54am. Two days after Lily's killing, Carson Peters-Berger, Lily's 14-year old cousin, was arrested and charged with the murder and rape of Lily. According to authorities, Carson confessed to killing Lily and that it was his plan the entire time to kill and rape her. The case is being treated as an adult case rather than a juvenile case due to Carson's murder charge. Carson's bail was set at $1 million. If convicted, he would face a sentence of life in prison.

Carson's late father, Adam Berger, had served 3 years in jail for possession of child pornography.

References

2022 in Wisconsin
April 2022 events in the United States
Deaths by person in Wisconsin
Deaths by strangulation in the United States
Incidents of violence against girls
Murder committed by minors
Rape in the 2020s
Rapes in the United States
Violence against women in the United States